Beneath Thy Protection is an ancient Christian hymn and prayer. It is one of the oldest known Marian prayers and among the most ancient preserved hymns to the Blessed Virgin Mary that is still in use. A papyrus containing it has been dated as early as the mid 3rd century. The hymn is well attested among the believers of the Catholic Church, the Eastern Orthodox Church and Oriental Orthodoxy.

History

The earliest text of this hymn was found in a Coptic Orthodox Christmas liturgy. Rylands Papyrus 470 records the hymn in Greek, and was dated to the 3rd century by papyrologist E. Lobel and by scholar C.H. Roberts to the 4th century. By contrast, Hans Förster dates it to the 8th century and states that Roberts merely quoted Lobel, and that there is no consensus on the early date. Although he notes that a number of scholars support Lobel and Roberts, Towarek follows Förster and others in concluding that the earliest textual witness to the hymn is of 6th/7th century provenance and that it only became liturgically prevalent in the Middle Ages. Nevertheless, recent scholarship has identified the hymn in the Georgian Iadgari (Chantbook) of Jerusalem, demonstrating that the Sub Tuum Praesidium was in liturgical use in the 5th century. Orthodox scholar Serafim Seppälä concludes that "there are no determinate theological or philological reasons to reject the 3rd century dating."

The Sub Tuum was part of the Order of Sulpician custom that all classes ended with a recitation of this prayer. Besides the Greek text, ancient versions can be found in Coptic, Syriac, Armenian and Latin.

Modern use

In the Byzantine Rite used by the Eastern Orthodox and Eastern Catholic Churches, the hymn is the last apolytikion of Vespers celebrated during Great Lent on Sunday evenings and weekdays. It is also the last apolytikion of Vespers on other Days of Alleluia outside of Great Lent. In Greek practice, it is usually sung in Neo-Byzantine chant.

In the Armenian Rite, the hymn is sung on the Eve of Theophany and is also used as an acclamation in the daily compline service known as the Rest Hour. A slightly different version of the hymn is appended to the Trisagion when the latter is chanted in the daily Morning and Evening Hours of the Daily Office.

The Slavonic version of the hymn is also often used outside of Great Lent, with the triple invocation  ("Most Holy Theotokos, save us") appended.

The prayer has a special importance in Ukrainian Orthodoxy because Ukrainians connect it to the Intercession aspect of the Mother of God, which in its turn is outstandingly hallowed in the Ukrainian tradition.

The hymn is used in the Coptic liturgy, as well as in the Armenian, Byzantine, Ambrosian, and Roman Rite liturgies.

In the Roman Rite of the Catholic Church it is used as the antiphon for the Nunc Dimittis at Compline in the Little Office of the Blessed Virgin Mary, and in the Liturgy of the Hours may be used as the Marian antiphon after Compline or Vespers outside of Eastertide.

The prayer has a special significance for Marists, and it is often heard in Marist schools and groups around the world. It is also commonly used by the Salesians in honor of Mary Help of Christians.

Since 2018, Pope Francis has asked to pray this hymn along with the Rosary and the Prayer to Saint Michael asking for the unity of the Church during October (2018) in the face of diverse scandals and accusations. In the official communiqué he added that "Russian mystics and the great saints of all the traditions advised, in moments of spiritual turbulence, to shelter beneath the mantle of the Holy Mother of God pronouncing the invocation 'Sub Tuum Praesidium'".

Musical settings
The Latin version has been set to music in the West many times, notably by Marc-Antoine Charpentier, (3 settings:  H.20, for 3 voices and bc, 1670; H.28, for 3 voices unaccompanied, 1681–82; H.352, for 1 voice and bc; late1680s), Antonio Salieri, Wolfgang Amadeus Mozart and Ludwig van Beethoven.

Other than the traditional and modern chant settings, which are the most commonly used, the most well-known musical setting in Slavonic traditiona is perhaps that of the Ukrainian composer Dmytro Bortniansky. Another Ukrainian version was composed by Ihor Sonevytsky.

Recensions

Greek

Church Slavonic
The earliest Church Slavonic manuscripts have the prayer in the following form:

This version continues to be used by the Old Believers today. In the 17th century, under the liturgical reforms of Patriarch Nikon of Moscow, the Russian Orthodox Church adopted a new translation (but parishes continue to use the form given above):

This second version continues in use today.

Latin
The Latin translation, likely derived from the Greek, dates from the 11th century: 

Some of the Latin versions have also incorporated the following verses often attributed to Saint Bernard of Clairvaux to the above translation:

 (Our Lady, our Mediatrix, Our Advocate)

 (Reconcile us to your Son)

 (Recommend us to your Son)

 (Represent us to your Son)

References

External links

 "Under thy compassion we take refuge..." Photograph of papyrus, dated to 250 AD, the earliest example of this hymn.

Catholic liturgy
Byzantine Rite
Eastern Orthodox Mariology
Oriental Orthodoxy
Marian devotions